Anbu Khaireni (also Aanbu Khaireni, Aanboo Khaireni or Anbukhaireni) is a rural municipality in Tanahu District in the Gandaki Province of central Nepal which was established in 2015. At the time of the 1991 Nepal census it had a population of 11,450 people living in 2234 individual households. In the census of 2011 the municipality has 16,382 inhabitants.

In 2017, the Government of Nepal restructured the local level bodies into 753 new local level units, at that time the former Anbu Khaireni Municipality restableshed as a rural municipality with same name. The former Chhimkeshwari and Deurali VDCs also were incorporated with this new rural municipality. The rural municipality rearranged into 6 wards.

The Andhi Khola River flows nearby. On its right bank is Satrasaya Phant, which was once a dense forest. The Anpu copper mines lie within a kilometre from the village.

To promote local culture Anbu khaireni has one FM radio station Mero Sathi FM - 107.2 MHz which is a Community radio station.And newly opened hospital Alisha healthcare polyclinic Pvt ltd.

Demographics
At the time of the 2011 Nepal census, Anbu Khaireni Rural Municipality had a population of 20,840. Of these, 65.7% spoke Nepali, 15.1% Gurung, 13.3% Magar, 1.7% Newar, 1.4% Bhujel, 0.8% Bhojpuri, 0.4% Tamang, 0.3% Maithili, 0.2% Hindi, 0.2% Urdu, 0.1% Bengali, 0.1% Rai, 0.1% Sign language, 0.1% Thakali and 0.1% other languages as their first language.

In terms of ethnicity/caste, 30.8% were Gurung, 22.9% Magar, 9.2% Chhetri, 8.3% Newar, 7.8% Hill Brahmin, 5.8% Gharti/Bhujel, 5.4% Kami, 2.1% Damai/Dholi,  1.1% Badi, 1.0% Thakuri, 0.9% Tamang, 0.7% Chepang/Praja, 0.6% Musalman, 0.6% Sarki, 0.4% Kumal, 0.3% Kathabaniyan, 0.3% Rai, 0.2% Teli, 0.2% Tharu, 0.2% Yadav, 0.1% Bengali, 0.1% Hajam/Thakur, 0.1% Kalwar, 0.1% Mallaha, 0.1% Sanyasi/Dasnami, 0.1% Thakali and 0.6% others.

In terms of religion, 76.8% were Hindu, 18.6% Buddhist, 2.9% Christian, 0.5% Bon, 0.5% Muslim, 0.1% Prakriti and 0.6% others.

In terms of literacy, 75.0% could read and write, 1.7% could only read and 23.1% could neither read nor write.

References

External links
Official site 
UN map of the municipalities of Tanahu District

Populated places in Tanahun District
Nepal municipalities established in 2015
Rural municipalities of Nepal established in 2017
Rural municipalities in Tanahun District